General Abdirizak Khalif Elmi is a Somali military commander. He is the Deputy Chief of the Somali National Army, having been appointed to the position on 13 March 2013 in place of Abdikarin Yusuf Dhega Badan. General Dahir Adan Elmi was concurrently named as the new Chief of Army. Khalif's term as Deputy Chief of Army ended on 26 September 2015, when he and Elmi were transferred by presidential decree to other positions. The shuffle was part of a larger major national security reform. Khalif was succeeded as Deputy Chief of Army by General Abdullahi Osman Agey, with General Abdullahi Anod concurrently appointed as the new Chief of Army.

References

Somalian military leaders
Living people
Somalian generals
Year of birth missing (living people)
Place of birth missing (living people)